HMS Birkenhead was one of two  light cruisers originally ordered for the Greek Navy in 1914. She was to be named Antinavarchos Kountouriotis after Vice Admiral Pavlos Kountouriotis. The order was placed with Cammell Laird and production continued for the Greek account after the outbreak of World War I in August 1914. In 1915, however, the two cruisers were purchased by the British government, and entered service with the Royal Navy.

Design and description
Based on the Birmingham sub-class of the Towns, the two Greek ships primarily differed from their British half-sisters in their armament. The Greeks specified that they would use the new BL 5.5-inch (140 mm) Mk I gun built by the Coventry Ordnance Works. This weapon was significantly lighter than the standard 6-inch (152 mm) gun, which allowed the ships to mount ten guns, rather than the nine of the Birminghams, and fired an  shell rather than the  shell of the 6-inch weapon. It therefore had a higher rate of fire with little loss in hitting power. The Greeks also specified a secondary armament of two 12-pounder anti-aircraft guns, but these were still under development in 1915 and a pair of 3-pounder guns on high-angle mounts were substituted instead.

Two of the 5.5-inch guns were mounted on the centreline fore and aft of the superstructure and the remaining eight guns were positioned on the broadside. All these guns were fitted with gun shields. Two Vickers 3-pounder (47 mm) anti-aircraft guns were also fitted. The armament was completed by two submerged 21-inch (533 mm) torpedo tubes.

Service
The ship was laid down as Yard number 809 on 27 March 1914. Despite the outbreak of the First World War in August 1914, Greece continued to pay for the two cruisers, and construction continued for Greece, with Antinavarhos Kountoriotis being launched on 18 January 1915. However, with the war dragging on with no sign of a quick result, the Admiralty soon decided to purchase the two ships, with Antinavarhos Kountoriotis being renamed Birkenhead. She was completed in July 1915.

Like her sister, Birkenhead was assigned to the 3rd Light Cruiser Squadron of the Grand Fleet. On 26 September 1915, the accommodation ship Caribbean got into difficulties in heavy weather off Cape Wrath when on passage to Scapa Flow. On receipt of Caribbeans distress signals, Birkenhead set out from Scapa to assist, and together with several tugs and yachts, rescued all but 15 of Caribbeans crew before the accommodation ship sank on the next morning. Birkenhead continued her work-up and training before formally joining the 3rd Light Cruiser Squadron on 6 November. On 31 May to 1 June 1916, Birkenhead and Chester both took part in the Battle of Jutland. Birkenhead survived the battle, and the war and was sold for scrap on 26 October 1921 to Cashmore, of Newport.

Notes

Bibliography

External links
Ships of the Birkenhead group
Battle of Jutland Crew Lists Project - HMS Birkenhead Crew List

 

Cruisers of the Hellenic Navy
Town-class cruisers (1910) of the Royal Navy
Ships built on the River Mersey
1915 ships
World War I cruisers of the United Kingdom